Diamond Girl may refer to:

Diamond Girl (film), a 1998 television film based on the Diana Palmer novel
Diamond Girl (album), an album by Seals and Crofts
"Diamond Girl" (Seals and Crofts song), 1973
"Diamond Girl" (Ryan Leslie song), 2007
"Diamond Girl", a single released by Nice & Wild in 1986
Diamond Girl, a novel by Diana Palmer
The Diamond Girls, a children's novel by Jacqueline Wilson